Seven Seas Explorer is an Explorer-class cruise ship currently operated by Regent Seven Seas Cruises, a subsidiary of Norwegian Cruise Line Holdings. Debuting in 2016, she became the first new-build ship for Regent in more than a decade and the largest ship to ever operate for Regent.

History

Planning 
On 10 July 2013, Regent Seven Seas Cruises announced it had entered into a contract with Italian shipbuilder, Fincantieri, to build a new vessel named Seven Seas Explorer. As on Seven Seas Voyager and Seven Seas Mariner, Regent intended to make Seven Seas Explorer an all-suite ship. The order for the ship reportedly cost US$450 million, with each berth costing over US$600,000, and was scheduled to debut in the summer of 2016. The debut of Seven Seas Explorer would reportedly mark an increase in Regent's capacity by up to 40%.

Construction 
On 15 July 2014, Regent celebrated the steel cutting of the new ship at Fincantieri's yard in Sestri Ponente, near Genoa.

On 21 January 2015, a coin ceremony was performed for the laying of the ship's keel. Three different coins were welded into the keel: a 1921 Peace dollar, a 1959 Italian lira, and a commemorative coin minted for the ceremony.

On 30 October 2015, Seven Seas Explorer floated out from the dry dock at the shipyard following completion of her exterior outfitting. The remainder of the construction was completed with the ship in wet dock.

Delivery and christening 
Seven Seas Explorer was delivered to Regent on 30 June 2016. She was christened in Monte Carlo by Charlene, Princess of Monaco on 13 July 2016.

In media
 The World's Most Expensive Cruise Ship Channel 5

Design and specifications 
Seven Seas Explorer currently features a total of 377 passenger cabins, all of which are suite accommodations. There are also a total of 325 crew cabins, making for a total capacity of 1,360 passengers and crew. Main propulsion is via two Wärtsilä propellers, each driven by a  electric motor.

The ship features all-inclusive dining establishments, including a steakhouse, a main dining room, and a convertible buffet-restaurant. There is also a two-level theater and different lounges, including an observation lounge and a music lounge. There are multiple suite categories among the offered accommodations, with each category of cabin showcasing different layouts and design elements, as well as including verandas with every cabin.

Service history

Deployments 
Seven Seas Explorer set sail on her 14-night maiden voyage on 20 July 2016 from Monte Carlo to Venice. The ship spent her inaugural season sailing in the Mediterranean, before re-positioning to Miami for cruises in the Caribbean. Since then, Seven Seas Explorer has also visited ports in Northern Europe, Africa, and South America.

As of February 2020, Seven Seas Explorer was sailing Caribbean voyages and Panama Canal transits, and re-positioned to Europe in April, sailing Northern Europe and Mediterranean itineraries. In the latter half of 2020, she was to debut in Asia, and sail her maiden Alaska season in the summer of 2021, however, these voyages were disrupted by the Covid-19 pandemic and the subsequent suspension of cruises embarking through September 2021. The ship had also been due to sail in Oceania in the winter of 2021.

References

External links 

Regent Seven Seas Cruises official site page about the ship
"Ultimate Cruise Ship," NOVA television program about the construction of the ship (aired Feb. 8, 2017) on PBS

2015 ships
Cruise ships
Ships built in Italy
Ships built by Fincantieri